The 2005 German Figure Skating Championships took place on January 6–9, 2005 at the Eissportzentrum Oberstdorf in Oberstdorf. Skaters competed in the disciplines of men's singles, ladies' singles, pair skating, ice dancing, and synchronized skating.

The first senior compulsory dance was the Golden Waltz and the second was the Midnight Blues.

Results

Men

Ladies

Pairs

Ice dancing

Synchronized

External links
 2005 German Championships results

German Figure Skating Championships, 2005
German Figure Skating Championships